Cereopsius copei is a species of beetle in the family Cerambycidae. It was described by Karl-Ernst Hüdepohl in 1993. It is known from the Philippines.

References

Cereopsius
Beetles described in 1993